Enrique Rettberg (12 August 1918 – 28 January 2000) was an Argentine épée fencer. He competed at the 1952 Summer Olympics.

References

External links
 

1918 births
2000 deaths
Argentine male épée fencers
Olympic fencers of Argentina
Fencers at the 1952 Summer Olympics
Argentine male modern pentathletes
Pan American Games medalists in modern pentathlon
Pan American Games bronze medalists for Argentina
Fencers at the 1951 Pan American Games
Medalists at the 1951 Pan American Games
20th-century Argentine people